The Dean of Derby is the head (primus inter pares – first among equals) and chair of the chapter of canons, the ruling body of Derby Cathedral. The dean and chapter are based at the Cathedral Church of All Saints in Derby. Before 2000 the post was designated as a provost, which was then the equivalent of a dean at most English cathedrals. The cathedral is the mother church of the Diocese of Derby of the Church of England and seat of the Bishop of Derby.

The incumbent dean, since July 2020, is Peter Robinson.

List of deans

Provosts
1931–1937 Herbert Ham
1937–1947 Philip Micklem
1947–1953 Ronald O'Ferrall
1953–1981 Ronald Beddoes
1981–1997 Benjamin Lewers
21 March 199817 March 2000 Michael Perham (became Dean)

Deans
17 March 20002004 Michael Perham (previously Provost)
2005December 2007 Martin Kitchen
13 September 200831 January 2010 Jeff Cuttell
9 October 201020 November 2016 John Davies
2 November 201630 September 2017: Sue Jones, Acting Dean, and Director of Mission and Ministry
30 September 201730 September 2019: Stephen Hance
20 July 2020present: Peter Robinson

References

Deans of Derby
Deans of Derby
 
Deans of Derby
Diocese of Derby